The 2014–15 season was Dundee's first season back in the top tier of Scottish football and their first season in the Scottish Premiership, having been promoted from the Scottish Championship at the end of the previous season. Dundee also competed in the League Cup and the Scottish Cup.

Season

Summary

Dundee finished sixth in the Scottish Premiership with 45 points. They also reached the third round of the League Cup and fifth round of the Scottish Cup.

Results and fixtures

Friendlies

Scottish Premiership

League Cup

Scottish Cup

Player statistics
During the 2014–15 season, Dundee have used twenty three different players in competitive games. The table below shows the number of appearances and goals scored by each player.

|-
|colspan="10"|Players who left the club during the 2014–15 season
|-

|}

Team statistics

League table

Transfers

Players in

Players out

Notes

1.Kickoff time in Western European Time/Western European Summer Time.
2.Dundee F.C.'s goals first.

References

Dundee F.C.
Dundee F.C. seasons